Alkalihalobacillus hunanensis is a Gram-positive, rod-shaped, slightly halophilic, aerobic, endospore-forming and motile bacterium from the genus of Alkalihalobacillus which has been isolated from forest soil from Hunan.

References

Bacillaceae
Bacteria described in 2020